John Percival Hughes, MBE (c. 1935 – 19 June 2013) was a Welsh ceramicist, known for devising and marketing the "Grogg", a range of collectible figurines representing well-known public figures, mostly rugby union players.

Hughes came from Pontypridd and launched his Groggs during the early 1970s when the Wales national rugby union team was at the height of its success and popularity.  After operating from his home, making figures of mythical creatures such as dragons and giants, he set up in a shop at Treforest, converted from a derelict pub, and later described his business as "a 45-year overnight success story".  He was awarded the MBE by Queen Elizabeth II in the 2010 Birthday Honours.

References

2013 deaths
British ceramicists
Members of the Order of the British Empire
1935 births